The Ethnographic Museum, formerly the National Museum of Rwanda, is a national museum in Rwanda. It is located in Butare. It is owned by Institute of National Museums of Rwanda.

It was built with help of the Belgian government and opened in 1989. It is also a good source of information on the cultural history of the country and the region. It is also known as the site of the murder of Queen Dowager Rosalie Gicanda and several others during the Rwandan genocide.

References

External links

 Ethnographic Museum  - Institute of National Museums of Rwanda
 National Museum of Rwanda (Archive)
 National Museum of Rwanda at National University of Rwanda

Buildings and structures in Butare
Museums in Rwanda
Museums established in 1989
1989 establishments in Rwanda
National museums